Mircze  is a village in Hrubieszów County, Lublin Voivodeship, in eastern Poland, close to the border with Ukraine. It is the seat of the gmina (administrative district) called Gmina Mircze.

The village has a population of 1,520.

References

Villages in Hrubieszów County
Kholm Governorate